A total solar eclipse will occur on Monday, August 24, 2082. A solar eclipse occurs when the Moon passes between Earth and the Sun, thereby totally or partly obscuring the image of the Sun for a viewer on Earth. A total solar eclipse occurs when the Moon's apparent diameter is larger than the Sun's, blocking all direct sunlight, turning day into darkness. Totality occurs in a narrow path across Earth's surface, with the partial solar eclipse visible over a surrounding region thousands of kilometres wide.

Related eclipses

Solar eclipses 2080–2083

Saros 146 

It is a part of Saros cycle 146, repeating every 18 years, 11 days, containing 76 events. The series started with partial solar eclipse on September 19, 1541. It contains total eclipses from May 29, 1938, through October 7, 2154, hybrid eclipses from October 17, 2172, through November 20, 2226, and annular eclipses from December 1, 2244, through August 10, 2659. The series ends at member 76 as a partial eclipse on December 29, 2893. The longest duration of totality was 5 minutes, 21 seconds on June 30, 1992.
<noinclude>

Metonic cycle

Notes

References

2082 08 24
2082 in science
2082 08 24
2082 08 24